Elisabethatriene is a bicyclic compound found in the marine octocoral Pseudopterogorgia elisabethae. Its stereochemistry is identical to the stereochemistry of elisabethatrienol.

References

Diterpenes
Vinylidene compounds
Polyenes